The International One Metre (IOM) is a class of Radio Sailing Boat used for racing under the World Sailing - Racing Rules of Sailing. It is a measurement-controlled box rule originally created by the ISAF-RSD (now the International Radio Sailing Association) in 1988 in an attempt to harmonise the various one metre rules created around the world. The IOM Class Rules specify a standardised sail plan and control of the other major performance dimensions (displacement, length, and draught) while allowing some freedom in hull design. The IOM is now the largest and arguably most competitive of all radio sailing classes.

History
The International One Metre Class Association was formed in 2003 as an owners association to support the class and promote racing. This function was originally carried out by the International Radio Sailing Association (previously known as the ISAF-RSD or Radio Sailing Division). The continuing association with IRSA entitles the class to hold World Championships officially recognised by the World Sailing.

Events

World Champions

European Champions

References

External links
  Official One Metre Class Association Website
  International Radio Sailing Association Website
  ISAF One Metre Microsite Website

Classes of the International Radio Sailing Association
Keelboats
Development sailing classes